Diceroprocta vitripennis, known generally as the green winged cicada or green winged scrub cicada, is a species of cicada in the family Cicadidae. It is found in Central America and North America.

References

Further reading

 
 

Articles created by Qbugbot
Insects described in 1830
Diceroprocta